Warden is the title of various officials.

Warden or The Warden may also refer to:

Arts and entertainment 
 The Warden, an 1855 novel by Anthony Trollope
 The Warden (TV series), a BBC 1951 mini-series adaptation of Trollope's novel
 The Warden (2019 film), an Iranian mystery drama
 The Warden (Superjail!), a character in the American animated television series Superjail!
 Elizabeth Warden (Keeping Up Appearances), a character from the British television show Keeping Up Appearances
 Warden Walker, a character in the novel Holes

Places
 Mount Warden, Marie Byrd Land, Antarctica
 Warden Pass, Coats Land, Antarctica, a mountain pass
 Lake Warden (Western Australia), a salt lake
 Warden, Quebec, Canada, a village
 Warden Peak, British Columbia, Canada
 Warden, Kent, England, a holiday village
 Warden, Northumberland, England, a village
 Warden Hill, a hill in the Lincolnshire Wolds, England
 Warden, Free State, South Africa, a town
 Warden, Washington, United States, a city
 Warden, West Virginia, United States, an unincorporated community
 Warden Lake, West Virginia, a reservoir
 Warden Branch, Missouri, United States, a stream

People
 Warden (surname)
 Warden Chilcott (1871–1942), British Member of Parliament

Other uses
 Warden (TTC), a subway station located in Toronto, Ontario, Canada
 Warden Avenue, a major north-south road in Scarborough, Ontario, Canada
 Warden or Wardon Abbey, a Cistercian abbey in Bedfordshire, England
 Warden pear, any of a number of pear varieties that do not truly ripen and must be cooked to be edible 
 Warden (software), a video game cheating prevention system used by Blizzard Entertainment

See also
 Warden message, an important message from the United States State Department about safety or travel information for U.S. citizens abroad
 Old Warden, Bedfordshire, England, a village and civil parish
 Worden (disambiguation)